Telegraph Hill also known as "Bourne Hill" is a mountain in Barnstable County, Massachusetts. Discovery Hill is located southeast of Telegraph Hill.

References

Mountains of Massachusetts
Mountains of Barnstable County, Massachusetts